Thomas Joseph Dart Kelly (3 May 1844 – 20 July 1893) was an Australian cricketer who played in two Test matches between 1877 and 1879. Kelly played domestic cricket for Victoria for 17 seasons, first appearing in the summer of 1863–64, and gained a reputation as a fine fielder.

Kelly made his Test debut in the Second Test of the 1876–77 season. In the second innings of the Test, Kelly hit 35 – his highest Test score – of which all but three runs came from boundaries.

References

External links

1844 births
1893 deaths
Sportspeople from County Waterford
Australia Test cricketers
Victoria cricketers
Melbourne Cricket Club cricketers
Australian cricketers
Irish emigrants to colonial Australia